The North Baden Cup (German: Badischer Pokal or BFV-Pokal) is one of the 21 regional cup competitions of German football. The winner of the competition gains entry to the first round of the German Cup.

History

The Cup was established in 1949, after the end of the Second World War, in the US occupation zone in the northern half of the state of Baden, which existed as part of the state of Württemberg-Baden from 1945 to 1952, when the state of Baden-Württemberg was formed. Due to the southern half of the state being under French occupation, the Baden football association was cut in half and a northern and southern federation was formed. The same happened with the regional cup competition.

The North Baden Cup is played annually, with the exception of 1950 to 1956, when it was not held.

From 1974 onwards, the winner of the South Baden Cup qualified for the first round of the German Cup. At times, the BFV was permitted to send both, winner and finalist to the first round of the German Cup, currently (2008–09), it is only the winner as North Baden is not one of the three largest federations, which are permitted to send two clubs.

The cup has been sponsored by the brewery Privatbrauerei Hoepfner since 1996 and therefore currently carries the name BFV-Hoepfner-Cup.

The North Baden cup winners have at times performed quite well in the national cup competition. In 1974–75, the first season the regional cup winners entered the DFB-Pokal directly, VfB Eppingen, the North Baden Cup winner, reached the fourth round of the cup, beating Bundesliga side Hamburger SV 2–1 on the way.

In 1990–91, the North Baden Cup winners FV 09 Weinheim defeated FC Bayern Munich 1–0 in the first round of the German Cup.

Modus
Professional clubs are not permitted to enter the competition, meaning, no teams from the Bundesliga and the 2. Bundesliga can compete.

All clubs from North Baden playing in the 3. Liga (III), Regionalliga Süd (IV) and Oberliga Baden-Württemberg (V), Verbandsliga Nordbaden (VI) and the three Landesligas (VII) gain direct entry to the first round. Additionally, the best teams of the regional cup competitions in North Baden also qualify for the competition.

Cup finals
Held annually at the end of season, these were the cup finals since 1949:

 Source: 
 Winners in bold

Winners
Listed in order of wins, the Cup winners are:

 1 Includes one win by the club's reserve side.

References

Sources
Deutschlands Fußball in Zahlen,  An annual publication with tables and results from the Bundesliga to Verbandsliga/Landesliga, publisher: DSFS

External links
 BFV: Nordbaden Football Association – Cup website 
Fussball.de: North Baden Cup 

Recurring sporting events established in 1949
Football cup competitions in Germany
Football competitions in Baden-Württemberg
1949 establishments in West Germany